Abenteuer (English: "Adventure") is the thirteenth studio album by German schlager singer Andrea Berg. It was released on 30 September 2011 in Germany and soon after in Austria and Switzerland. It marks Berg's second collaboration with Dieter Bohlen.

Background 

Like its predecessor Schwerelos (2010), Abenteuer was produced by Dieter Bohlen. The songs were composed by Bohlen, who provided Berg with the melodies for her to write lyrics. According to Berg, Abenteuer is the first album for which she wrote all the lyrics alone. In the booklet, the singer referred to the development phase of the album as a time "at which life was like shoes [made] of lead" and cites her father's death of cancer in April 2011 as one of the reasons. The song "Seelenverwandt" is dedicated to him. The album title, the German word for "adventure", represents Berg's wish to express that every day is a new chance and a first time.

Track listing 

All tracks on all editions are produced by Dieter Bohlen.

Notes
 According to hitparade.ch, there are several editions of Abenteuer with a different track 15: none, "Ich schieß dich auf den Mond (Foxtown-Mix)" (4:00) for the Mediamarkt Edition, "Lebenslänglich (Foxtown-Mix)" (3:00), or "Wenn du da bist" (3:45).
 "Das kann kein Zufall sein" (English: "That Cannot Be a Coincidence") uses the melody of "Call My Name", originally performed in 2011 by Deutschland sucht den Superstar winner Pietro Lombardi.
 "Wenn du da bist" (English: "When You Are Here") uses the melody of "It's All Over", originally performed in 1991 by Bohlen (as Blue System) with Dionne Warwick.
 The DVD is included both in the Deluxe Edition, which features the standard tracklist with 14 songs, and in the Premium Edition.

Charts

Weekly charts

Year-end charts

See also 

 List of number-one hits of 2011 (Germany)
 List of number-one hits of 2011 (Austria)

References

External links 

 Andrea Berg's official website 

2011 albums
Andrea Berg albums